Maana Patel (born 18 March 2000) is an Indian backstroke swimmer from Ahmedabad, Gujarat.

Swimming career
Maana Patel started swimming when she was seven.

Manna Patel, first Indian female swimmer who qualified for Tokyo Olympics will compete in the women's 100m backstroke event. The 21-year-old swimmer suffered an ankle injury in 2019 and only made a comeback earlier this year.

When she was 13, she clocked 2:23.41s in the 200m backstroke at 40th Junior National Aquatics Championship in Hyderabad breaking the national record of 2:26.41s held by Shikha Tandon at the Asian Age Group Championship in Tokyo in August 2009. Maana has won gold medals in 50 backstroke and 200 metre backstroke also at the National Games. Maana has also won gold medal in 100 metre backstroke at the 60th National School Games (2015) breaking the national record in backstroke.

She was selected for the Olympic Gold Quest in 2015. She had won the silvers in 50 metre, 100 metre and 200 metre backstroke; bronze in 50 metre free style; gold in 4×100 metre freestyle relay; 4×100 metre medley relay at the 12th South Asian Games (2016).

Maana won 3 gold medals at 72nd Senior National Aquatic Championships-2018.

Maana won six medals (1 gold, 4 silver, 1 bronze) at the 10th Asian Age-group Championships-2019 which was held in Bangalore.

As of October 2021 , she has won 32 international, 99 national medals with 31 national records.

Personal life 
She studied commerce at the Udgam School for Children, Ahmedabad. She was coached by Kamlesh Nanavati at the Gujarat Vidyapeeth Swimming Centre. She currently trains at the Dolphin Aquatics in bengaluru under coach Nihar Ameen .

References

External links
 
Maana Patel  athlete profile at 2020 Tokyo Olympics

2000 births
Living people
Indian female swimmers
21st-century Indian women
21st-century Indian people
Sportswomen from Gujarat
People from Ahmedabad
Swimmers at the 2020 Summer Olympics
Olympic swimmers of India
South Asian Games gold medalists for India
South Asian Games silver medalists for India
South Asian Games bronze medalists for India
South Asian Games medalists in swimming
Gujarati people
Olympic athletes of India